Kim Oe-sook (Korean: 김외숙; Hanja: 金外淑; born 10 August 1967) is a South Korean lawyer served as President Moon Jae-in's Senior Presidential Secretary for Personnel Affairs from 2019 to 2022 and previously served as his first Minister of Government Legislation - the second woman ever to lead the Ministry.

After passing the bar exam in 1989 and completing the training at the Judicial Research and Training Institute in 1992, she began and dedicated her career as a lawyer at law firm Busan, which is founded by Moon after former President and then-lawyer Roh Moo-hyun quit a law firm Roh and Moon jointly opened to become a lawmaker.

Kim took various roles: the Vice-president of Korean Women Lawyers Association, a member of Busan Regional Labor Relations Commission, a Commissioner of Council of Conciliation at Busan High Court and a member of Busan and Gyeongsangbuk-do Administrative Appeals Commissions. She also taught and led a law clinic at Dong-A University Law School as an adjunct professor.

Kim is one of few senior officials of Office of the President Moon Jae-in to keep their post despite offering their resignation in midst of Moon's secretariat reshuffles in August 2020.

She holds two degrees in law - a bachelor from Seoul National University and a master's from University of Virginia Law School.

References 

1967 births
Living people
20th-century South Korean lawyers
South Korean women lawyers
Seoul National University alumni
University of Virginia School of Law alumni
Women government ministers of South Korea
Government ministers of South Korea
People from Pohang
21st-century South Korean lawyers
Academic staff of Dong-a University